Lawrence Gubow (January 10, 1919 – March 26, 1978) was a United States district judge of the United States District Court for the Eastern District of Michigan.

Education and career

Born in Detroit, Michigan, Gubow received an Artium Baccalaureus degree from the University of Michigan in 1940. He received a Bachelor of Laws from University of Michigan Law School in 1950. He was in the United States Army as a Captain from 1941 to 1948. He was in private practice of law in Detroit from 1951 to 1953. He was Commissioner of the Michigan Corporations and Securities Commission from 1953 to 1961. He was United States Attorney for the Eastern District of Michigan from 1961 to 1968.

Federal judicial service

Gubow was nominated by President Lyndon B. Johnson on August 2, 1968, to a seat on the United States District Court for the Eastern District of Michigan vacated by Judge Wade H. McCree. He was confirmed by the United States Senate on September 13, 1968, and received his commission on September 14, 1968. His service was terminated on March 26, 1978, due to his death.

See also
 List of Jewish American jurists

References

Sources
 

1919 births
1978 deaths
United States Attorneys for the Eastern District of Michigan
Judges of the United States District Court for the Eastern District of Michigan
United States district court judges appointed by Lyndon B. Johnson
20th-century American judges
University of Michigan Law School alumni
United States Army officers
20th-century American lawyers
Military personnel from Michigan
United States Army personnel of World War II